Yuriy Fedorovych Kravchenko (March 5, 1951 – March 4, 2005) was a Ukrainian General of Internal Service and statesman, serving as the country's Minister of Internal Affairs (1995—2001). In 2000, while he was serving as the Minister of Internal Affairs, Kravchenko became directly involved in the murder case of Georgiy Gongadze and the subsequent "Cassette Scandal." Kravechenko later was the governor of the Kherson Oblast (2001—2002) and Head of the State Tax Administration of Ukraine  (2002—2003).

Biography 
Born in Oleksandriia, Kirovohrad Oblast, Kravchenko attended the Oleksandriia Industrial Technical School from 1966 to 1970. In October 1970, he became an electrictian and worked in the Kirovohrad Oblast. Served in the Soviet Army from 1970 to 1972. From 1974 until 1978, he studied at the Higher School of the MVD of the USSR, and afterwards worked as a police inspector in the Kirovohrad Oblast. From 1981 to 1986, he worked in several supervisory positions. In April 1986, Kravchenko became the head of the department for combating drug trade in the Criminal Investigation Directorate of the MVD of the Ukrainian SSR. In September 1989, he became the head of the MVD regional directorate in the Kirovohrad Oblast.

Gongadze Case and Cassette Scandal 

On 29 January 2013 a Ukrainian court ruled Oleksiy Pukach had murdered the journalist Georgiy Gongadze on orders from Kravchenko, who was seeking a career promotion.

Death 
Kravchenko was found dead in his apartment near Kyiv on March 4, 2005. He was at that time called as a witness in the murder case of Gongadze. It was claimed that Kravchenko committed suicide. Some news reports claim that he was shot twice in the head.

See also 
 Leonid Kuchma
 Ukraine without Kuchma
 Politics of Ukraine
 Government of Ukraine
 Multiple gunshot suicide

References

External links
  The Key Witness in the Gongadze Case Dead (March 2005 Ukrayinska Pravda article on the death of Kravchenko, analysing also his role in Gongadze case - includes fragments of the Melnychenko recordings featuring Kravchenko)

Generals of the Internal Service (Ukraine)
1951 births
2005 deaths
Multiple gunshot suicides
Suicides by firearm in Ukraine
Interior ministers of Ukraine
Ukrainian politicians who committed suicide
People from Oleksandriia
Recipients of the Order of Bohdan Khmelnytsky, 3rd class
Governors of Kherson Oblast
Burials at Baikove Cemetery